Josh Thomas is an Australian born blues guitarist born in the early 1970s in Adelaide, South Australia. His family comes from the Northern Territory's Barkly Tablelands. His parents were from the stolen generation.

In the 1990s he was a member of Thylacine, who released two albums through CAAMA music, Thylacine Live (1995) and Nightmare Dreaming (1997).
In 1998 he won Triple J's Unearthed competition. He played guitars on the 2005 Australian Songwriters Association (ASA)'s 'Songwriter of the Year' award winning, "Someone Special" by Worldfly. Thomas is contracted to two record labels CAAMA Music and Festival Mushroom Records.

In 2009 Thomas supported blues legend Eric Bibb at the Darwin Entertainment Centre. In 2010 he headlined the Darwin Blues Festival, with his Jimi Hendrix tribute band Purple Daze. He also performed at the 2011 Darwin Blues Festival with his band Cold Turkey.

2012 played lead guitar for Big BIll Morgafield (son of Muddy Waters) Australian performance.

Solo discography

Albums
 The Blues – (30 January 2008)
 Bread 'n' Butta – (10 January 2009)
 Lady Luck – (27 February 2009)
Thylacine live (1995)
Nightmare Dreaming (1996)

Singles and EPs
 "Blues, Blues, Blues" – (2 February 2011)
 "Standing at the Crossroads" (22 March 2011)

References

External links 

He's Got The Blues: an interview with Josh Thomas.

Indigenous Australian musicians
Australian blues guitarists
Australian male guitarists
Living people
1970 births
21st-century guitarists
21st-century Australian male musicians
21st-century Australian musicians